Bangalore is home to many educational and research institutions and has played a significant role in the contribution towards skill development. Bangalore is considered to be one of the educational hubs in India.

History
Until the early 19th century, education in Bangalore was mainly run by religious leaders and restricted to students of that religion. The western system of education was introduced during the rule of Mummadi Krishnaraja Wodeyar. Subsequently, the British Wesleyan Mission established the first English school in 1832 known as Wesleyan Canarese School. The Bangalore High School was started by the Mysore Government in 1858, and Bishop Cotton Boys' School was started in 1865. In 1945 when World War II came to an end, King George Royal Indian Military Colleges was started at Bangalore by King George VI, the school is popularly known as Bangalore Military School

In independent India, schools for young children (16 months to 5 years) are called nursery, kindergarten or Play school which are broadly based on Montessori or Multiple intelligence methodology of education.  Primary and secondary education in Bangalore is offered by various schools and junior colleges which are affiliated to one of the boards of education, such as the Karnataka Secondary Education Examination Board, Indian Certificate of Secondary Education, Central Board for Secondary Education, International Baccalaureate, International General Certificate of Secondary Education and National Institute of Open Schooling and Karnataka PUC Board. Schools in Bangalore are either government run or are private (both aided and un-aided by the government). Bangalore has a significant number of International schools due to expats and IT crowd. Students after completing their secondary education (SSLC, SSC) i.e Class 10th, will further pursue higher secondary education i.e Class 11th and Class 12th by either attending a Junior College or by continuing High School in one of three streams – Science, Commerce or Arts. Alternatively, students may also enroll in Diploma courses. Upon completing the required coursework, students enroll in general or professional degrees in universities through regular or lateral entry.

Below are some of the historical schools in Bangalore and their year of establishment.

 United Mission School (1832)
 St John's High School (1854)
 Sacred Heart Girls' High School (1854)
 St. Joseph's Boys' High School (1858)
 Bishop Cotton Boys' School (1865)
 Bishop Cotton Girls' School (1865)
 Cathedral High School (1866)
 Baldwin Boys' High School (1880)
 Baldwin Girls' High School (1880)
 St. Joseph's Indian High School (1904)
 St Anthony's Boys' School (1913)
 Clarence High School (1914)
 St. Germain High School (1944)
 Bangalore Military School (1946)
 Sophia High School (1949)

Institutions
The Bangalore University, established in 1886, provides affiliation to over 500 colleges, with a total student enrolment exceeding 300,000. The university has two campuses within Bangalore – Jnanabharathi and Central College. University Visvesvaraya College of Engineering was established in the year 1917, by Bharat Ratna Sir M. Visvesvaraya, At present, the UVCE is the only engineering college under the Bangalore University. Bangalore also has many private Engineering Colleges affiliated to Visvesvaraya Technological University.

Christ University Founded in 1969 as Christ College, the University Grants Commission (UGC) of India conferred autonomy to Christ College in 2004. On 22 July 2008 it was declared as an institution deemed to be university under section 3 of UGC Act 1956 by the Ministry of Education (India). CHRIST (Deemed to be University) is one of the most prestigious university in India Accredited by NAAC with A+ grade. CHRIST University has total six campuses including two off-campuses one in Delhi NCR, another in Pune Lavasa.

Indian Institute of Science, which was established in 1909 in Bangalore, National Centre for Biological Sciences, Jawaharlal Nehru Centre for Advanced Scientific Research and the Raman Research Institute are the premier institutes for scientific research and study in India. Nationally renowned universities and institutes such as National Institute of Design, National Institute of Fashion Technology, National Law School of India University, the Indian Institute of Management, Bangalore, International Institute of Informatics Bangalore (IIIB), International Institute of Information Technology, Bangalore, RV Educational Institutions, Symbiosis International University, SVKM's NMIMS, University of Agricultural Sciences, Bangalore, the ICAR-National Institute of Animal Nutrition and Physiology, the Indian Statistical Institute are located in Bangalore. The city is also home to the premier mental health institution in India National Institute of Mental Health and Neuro Sciences. Bangalore also has some of the best medical colleges in the country, like St. John's Medical College and Bangalore Medical College and Research Institute. The M. P. Birla Institute of Fundamental Research has a branch located in Bangalore. Mount Carmel College, a premier institution for women's education in India is located in Bangalore. It is affiliated to Bangalore University.

Weekend programmes
The Japanese Weekend School of Bangalore (バンガロール日本人補習授業校 Bangarōru Nihonjin Hoshū Jugyō Kō), a Japanese weekend educational programme, serves Japanese nationals living in Bangalore. It holds its classes in the Canadian International School in Yelahanka, Bangalore. Cultural classes are held at White Petals School, Yelahanka.

References

Works cited
 

 
Schools in Karnataka